Life Is Tough, Eh Providence? (also known as Sometimes Life Is Hard - Right, Providence?) is a 1972 Italian-Spanish Spaghetti Western comedy film directed by Giulio Petroni. The film was a box office success and generated an immediate sequel, Here We Go Again, Eh Providence? (Ci risiamo, vero Provvidenza?).

Cast 

 Tomas Milian: Provvidenza
 Gregg Palmer: Hurricane Kid Smith
 Janet Agren: Stella
 Dieter Eppler: Sheriff Howard Pendleton 
 Maurice Poli: Sheriff von Keensburg
 Giovanni Cianfriglia: The Challenger (credited as Ken Wood)
 Paul Muller: Mr. Summitt
 Mike Bongiorno: Mike Goodmorning
 Gabriella Giorgelli: Sister 
 Horst Janson: Sheriff of the village

References

External links

1972 films
Films directed by Giulio Petroni
Spaghetti Western films
1970s Western (genre) comedy films
Films scored by Ennio Morricone
1972 comedy films
1970s Italian films
1970s Italian-language films